Cony High School is a public school located in Augusta, Maine, United States that educates students from Grades 9 to 12. Cony draws its students from Augusta, as well as the surrounding communities of Chelsea, China, Jefferson, Palermo, Somerville, Vassalboro, Whitefield, and Windsor.

The school's origins are in the Cony Female Academy, which was founded in 1816 by Daniel Cony to provide free education to orphans and other girls under the age of 16. The school later expanded into a co-ed high school. In the fall of 2006, the city of Augusta opened a new Cony High School adjacent to the Capital Area Technical Center on Pierce Drive. Three years later, it was consolidated with local middle schools, and currently serves grades 7-12.

The new building is architecturally linked to the design of the Old Cony High School building which featured a wedge-shaped flatiron design. The flatiron building has been preserved as a building of historical significance and is in the National Register of Historic Places in Maine.

As of 2018–19 enrollment for Cony High is approximately 680 students.

Academics and rankings
In the 2020 US News & World Report (based on results for the 2017–2018 academic year), Cony High School was ranked between 47 and 83 among ranked high schools in the state and between 13,345 and 17,792 of ranked schools nationally. The school's mathematics proficiency rating was 26%, its reading proficiency rating was 42%, and its graduation rate was 79%, well below the state average of 87%.

Athletics
Cony competes in the Kennebec Valley Athletic Conference as a Class A school in all sports but football. The Rams field teams in football, soccer, field hockey, cross country, golf, volleyball, basketball, cheerleading, ice hockey, indoor track, swimming, wrestling, baseball, softball, tennis, lacrosse, and outdoor track. Cony and rival Gardiner Area High School hold one of the longest-running high school football rivalries in the country. Since 1892, the two teams have met 123 continuous years, with Cony holding a 65-55-10 advantage. Cony is well known for having one of the rowdiest student cheering sections in the state, referred to as the "Cony Crazies."
Baseball - Class A State Champions (1990, 1991).
Girls' Basketball - Class A State Champions (1987, 1989, 1995, 1996, 1998, 2005, 2007). 
Boys' Basketball - Class A State Champions (1966, 1973, 1978).
Football - Class B State Champions (1932, 2013)
Field Hockey - Class A State Champions (1982, 1988, 1989, 1993, 1995).
Softball - Class A State Champions (1983, 2012).
Girls' Tennis - Class A State Champions (1991).
Boys' Tennis - Class A State Champions (1993, 1972).
Girls' Track & Field - Class B State Champions (2021).

Chizzle Wizzle 
Cony High School's "Chizzle Wizzle" variety show is the longest running high school production in the United States. It originated in the 1890s as a football fundraiser and has evolved into a major part of the Augusta community. In 2016, the production hit the stage for its 125th consecutive year.
The show consists of two halves, Olio and Showcase. The production runs for 4 nights at the end of every March and culminates with the Chizzle Wizzle Ball on Saturday night. The name, "Chizzle Wizzle" comes from one of the school's many old cheers: "Chizzle Wizzle, Chizzle Wizzle, sis boom bah! Cony High, Cony High, rah, rah, rah!"

Notable alumni 
 Mildred Burrage, artist
 Julia Clukey, luger
 Kenneth M. Curtis, lawyer and former politician
 Richard Dysart, actor
 Hoddy Hildreth, politician and conservationist
 Roger Katz, politician and lawyer
 Ben Lucas, football player
 Rachel Nichols, actress and model
 Niles Perkins, athlete and physician
 Bob Pickett, football player and coach
 Jeffrey Pierce, politician and builder
 Matthew Pouliot, politician and realtor
 Stanley Sproul, politician and lawyer
 Dorothy Clarke Wilson, writer and dramatist

References

External links 
 

Public high schools in Maine
Buildings and structures in Augusta, Maine
Education in Augusta, Maine
Schools in Kennebec County, Maine
Public middle schools in Maine